The posterior auricular artery is a small artery that arises from the external carotid artery, above the digastric muscle and stylohyoid muscle, opposite the apex of the styloid process.

It ascends posteriorly beneath the parotid gland, along the styloid process of the temporal bone, between the cartilage of the ear and the mastoid process of the temporal bone along the lateral side of the head. The posterior auricular artery gives off the stylomastoid artery, small branches to the auricle, and supplies blood to the scalp posterior to the auricle. A person may be able to "hear" their own heart rate via this artery, under certain conditions.

See also
 Anterior auricular branches of superficial temporal artery
 Posterior auricular nerve

Additional images

Arteries of the head and neck